Alissa Firsova (Russian: Алиса Фирсова; 24 July 1986) is a Russian-British classical composer, pianist and conductor.

Born in Moscow to the composers Elena Firsova and Dmitri Smirnov, she moved to the UK in 1991.

In 2001 she won the BBC/Guardian/Proms Young Composer Competition with her piano piece "Les Pavots".

She graduated from Purcell School as a composer and pianist in 2004, and Royal Academy of Music as a pianist in 2009, where she also developed her conducting studies with Paul Brough.

In 2009 she entered the Conducting Postgraduate Course in Royal Academy of Music under the tuition of Colin Metters.

Her piano teachers included Tatiana Kantorovich, Valéria Szervánszky, James Gibb, Simon Mulligan, Hamish Milne, Ian Fountain, and Stephen Kovacevich.  Among her composition teachers were Jeoffrey Sharkey, Richard Dubugnon, Jonathan Cole and Simon Speare. She also participated in workshops and master classes with composers Nicholas Maw, Simon Holt, Anthony Gilbert, David Bedford, David Matthews, and Mark-Anthony Turnage.

She had her Wigmore Hall debut in May 2009, followed by a Royal Albert Hall debut playing Stravinsky's Les Noces in the Proms festival in August. Her "Bach Allegro", commissioned by BBC Proms, was premiered in Royal Albert Hall in August 2010 by the Royal Philharmonic Orchestra under Andrew Litton.

Her solo piano debut CD Russian Emigres was released by the Vivat label. Alissa's music is featured in a Proms Portrait on 27 August 2015, prior to the world premiere of her "Bergen’s Bonfire" by the Bergen Philharmonic Orchestra and Andrew Litton.

Works
Op. 1, Les Pavots for solo piano
Op. 2, Strength Through Joy for symphony orchestra
Op. 3, Three Pieces for cello and piano
Op. 4, The Entire City for string quintet
Op. 5, I tell you the truth, today you will be with me in heaven for wind and string ensemble
Op. 6, Rhapsody for solo violin
Op. 7, Lyrisches Stuck for viola and piano
Op. 8, Prophet for mixed chorus
Op. 9, Expressions for clarinet and piano
Op. 10, Loss for clarinet quintet
Op. 11, The Endless Corridor for piano
Op. 12, Birth of Remembrance for flute, clarinet, violin and cello
Op. 13, Lune Rouge for piano
Op. 14, Age of Reason for string quartet
Op. 15, Celebration for clarinet, flute, violin and cello
Op. 16, Tamaris for two cellos
Op. 17, Bluebells for piano solo, clarinet, horn, string quartet and percussion (third movement of Family Concerto, In memory of Dmitri Shostakovich – family project)
Op. 18, Paradiso for string quartet (third movement of "Divine Comedy" – family project)
Op. 19, Freedom (Clarinet Concerto)
Op. 20, Zhivago Songs to Boris Pasternak's poems for voice and piano
Op. 21, Moonlight over the Sea based on Munch's painting for solo violin
Op. 22, Chateau de Canisy for voice and piano
Op. 23,  Souvenir Melancolique  for clarinet and horn 
Bach Allegro for large symphony orchestra (transcription of the third movement of Bach's 3rd Viola da Gamba Sonata, BWV 1029). Proms Commission 2010.
Op. 24,  Kubla Khan for tenor, bayan, violin and cello (fifth movement of family project)  
Op. 25,  Gallo Variations for chamber orchestra 
Op. 26,  Unity for bass-baritone and piano 
Op. 27,  Serenade for Strings for string orchestra 
Op. 28,  Paradisi Gloria for SATB choir a cappella 
Op. 29,  Fantasy for cello and piano 
Op. 30,  Stabat Mater for SATB choir a cappella 
Op. 31,  Bergen’s Bonfire for Symphony Orchestra (Triple winds) 
Op. 32,  Tree of Hope for 4 Harps 
Op. 33,  Le Soleil de Conques for two solo cellos and string orchestra
Op. 34,  Bride of the Wind for piano-duet
Op. 35,  Asiago Concerto for piano trio and chamber orchestra
Op. 36,  Tennyson Fantasy for string quartet

References

External links

Article in  The Guardian (UK)
Article in  The Observer (UK)
 Article in Musicalpointers (UK)
Article in Classica FM (Russia) 
 Unreleased recording of her performance of her father's Piano Sonata No. 6 Blake-Sonata (2008), in two movements
 
 

1986 births
Living people
20th-century British composers
20th-century classical composers
20th-century women composers
21st-century British composers
21st-century classical composers
21st-century classical pianists
21st-century women composers
British classical pianists
British people of Russian descent
British women classical composers
Child classical musicians
Russian classical composers
Russian classical pianists
Russian women classical composers
Russian women pianists
Musicians from Moscow
Soviet emigrants to the United Kingdom
Women classical pianists
Alumni of the Royal Academy of Music
20th-century women pianists
21st-century women pianists